Thodakkam ( Beginning) is a 2008 Indian Tamil language thriller film starring Raghu Vannan and Monica directed by Muthukumar. Prior to release the film was known as Arambam. The film opened to poor reviews, and went unnoticed at box-office.

Plot
Vanchinathan (Raguvannan), Gayathri (Monica), Chindo (Abinay), Habeeb (Rishi) and Nancy (Meha Nair) have studied together from childhood. Now graduates, they plan to find opportunities abroad to earn money. The day arrives but their plans are thwarted as they find themselves in the thick of a conspiracy.

Cast 
Raghu Vannan as Vanchinathan 
Monica as Gayathri 
Abhinay as Chindo
Rishi as Habeeb
Meha Nair as Nancy
Raghuvaran
Subair Mohamed Rikas

Soundtrack
Soundtrack was composed by Jerome Pushparaj.
"Yaar Yaaro" — Gautham, Maya
"Adamin Apple" — Ranjani-Gayatri, Sathyan
"Phone Pottu" — Gana Bala
"Ethuthan Mudiyathu" — Raghuvaran
"Vaa Nanba" — Vijay Yesudas

References

External links
 

2000s action drama films
2008 films
2000s Tamil-language films
Indian action drama films
2008 directorial debut films
2008 drama films